Halogy is a village in Vas county, Hungary. Its Neo-Gothic church was built in 1896.

Apart from the Church, the main civic buildings consist of the Village Hall, one pub and a small co-operative shop.

External links 
 Street map (Hungarian)
 Steve Welsh's Halogy Project blog, an Englishman living in Halogy, giving glimpses of village life
 Official site (Hungarian)

Populated places in Vas County